Achingills is a small hamlet in Halkirk, Caithness within Highland region and is in the Scottish council area of the Highland. Scotland.

Achingills Farm is home to the Williamson family who have farmed it since 1988.

References

Populated places in Caithness